Leslie Ferdinand MBE (born 8 December 1966) is an English football coach, former professional footballer and television pundit, who is currently the director of football at Queens Park Rangers.

A striker, his playing career included notable spells in the Premier League with Queens Park Rangers, Newcastle United, Tottenham Hotspur, West Ham United, Leicester City and Bolton Wanderers. He also played in Turkey with Beşiktaş and in the Football League with Brentford, Reading and Watford. Prior to becoming a professional player, Ferdinand had played non-league football with both Southall and Hayes. He was capped and 17 caps for England and was part of the Euro 96 and World Cup 98 squads. He is the eleventh-highest scorer in the history of the Premier League, with 149 goals and he contributed a further 49 assists in the division.

Since his retirement, Ferdinand has largely worked as a television pundit, but re-joined Tottenham Hotspur as strikers coach in 2008, he remained with Spurs until 2014 before returning to QPR as director of football. In 2015 he was named as caretaker manager for a short period.

Early and personal life
Ferdinand was born in Acton, Greater London. He is the cousin of football-playing brothers Rio and Anton Ferdinand and Maidenhead United player Kane Ferdinand.

His autobiography, Sir Les, was published in 1997.

He was made an MBE in the 2005 Birthday Honours.

In an interview with the Evening Standard in February 2020, Ferdinand stated that fans racially abused him during his stints as a player and director of football.

Club career

Early career
Ferdinand started his career in non-league football, first at Viking Sports before moving to Southall. He made his league debut for Southall in August 1984 against Chertsey Town, and was part of the team which reached the FA Vase final in 1986, losing 3–0 to Halesowen Town. Following this, Ferdinand moved to Hayes, where he scored 20 goals in 42 appearances in all competitions (including friendlies). He was spotted by Queens Park Rangers and moved there for £50,000.

Queens Park Rangers
Ferdinand made his QPR debut on 20 April 1987, aged 20, as a substitute in the 4–0 league defeat by Coventry City at Highfield Road – the first of two league appearances that season. He played a further league game in 1987–88, and was loaned for three games to Third Division Brentford. In 1988, he was loaned to Turkish side Beşiktaş for a season, and performed well with 14 goals in 24 league games and he also got his first taste of silverware, helping the club to a 3–1 aggregate victory over Fenerbahçe S.K. in the Turkish Cup.

He returned to the QPR side for the 1989–90 season, and appeared in nine First Division matches as well as scoring his first two English league goals. He fared better in 1990–91, playing in 18 league games and scoring eight goals as QPR ended up in a mid-table position. His 10 goals from 23 games in 1991–92 helped ensure QPR's status as founder members of the new FA Premier League for the 1992–93 season, and it was during this campaign that he established himself as a top striker, scoring 20 goals in 37 games as QPR finished fifth — the highest placed of all the London sides. In his autobiography, Sir Les, Ferdinand wrote of his pride at scoring a hat-trick in a 5–3 win against Everton at Goodison Park in April 1993, a place where he had previously received racist abuse:

Ferdinand's fine form continued into 1993–94, during which his 16 goals from 36 games helped QPR finish ninth. Despite mounting speculation of a move to either Manchester United or Arsenal, he signed a two-year contract with QPR that summer. In 1994–95, he scored 24 times in the Premier League and speculation grew that he would soon be on his way to a bigger club. In nearly a decade at Loftus Road, he played under four different managers – Jim Smith, Trevor Francis, Don Howe and Gerry Francis.

Newcastle United
Ferdinand was sold to Newcastle in 1995 for £6 million, with Hayes receiving £600,000 due to a sell-on clause agreed following his move to QPR. With the money received, Hayes built a function suite and named it "The Ferdinand Suite" in his honour. His arrival at the club came nearly three years after the Magpies had offered QPR £3.3million for him during their Division One promotion season — but the offer had been turned down.

The spell on Tyneside was arguably Ferdinand's most successful club tenure. He scored 29 goals in his first season with Newcastle, and significantly contributed to the side's getting within touching distance of the Premiership title in the 1995–96 season. Newcastle led the league by 12 points at one stage, but were overhauled by Manchester United in the final three months of the season.

In both of his seasons on Tyneside, Ferdinand collected runners-up medals in the Premier League. In the second season, they contested a four-horse race with Manchester United, Arsenal and Liverpool before Manchester United won the title. Midway through the 1996–97 season, however, came a change, as manager Kevin Keegan surprisingly departed Newcastle and was replaced by Kenny Dalglish. Despite the Scot being regretful to lose such a talented striker, it quickly became apparent Ferdinand would be dispensed to free up funds for further signings. In an interview with Sky Sports in 2019, Ferdinand admitted that he regretted leaving Newcastle and had hoped at the time to stay on Tyneside for the rest of his career.

Ferdinand scored 50 goals in only 84 games at Newcastle, forming a successful strike partnership with Alan Shearer. He was very highly thought of by the Newcastle United supporters during his spell with the club and is known affectionately as 'Sir Les' on Tyneside.

Ferdinand received a standing ovation when he returned to St James' Park as a Tottenham player, trying to put Shearer's number 9 shirt on to complete a lap of honour, he broke down in tears and could only manage to put the shirt on inside out and back to front before being helped from the field. Ferdinand returned again, when he also received a standing ovation, coming on as a substitute at Alan Shearer's testimonial and subsequently scored.

He was inducted into the Newcastle United Foundation Hall of Fame on 7 November 2017.

Tottenham Hotspur
In 1997 Ferdinand was bought by Tottenham Hotspur, the club he supported as a boy, for £6 million. Injuries heavily disrupted his first season at the club, but towards the end of the campaign he formed a good partnership with Jürgen Klinsmann, and the pair's goals saved Spurs from relegation from the Premiership. Ferdinand helped Spurs win the League Cup in 1999, defeating Leicester City 1–0 in the final at Wembley, but injuries restricted him to just 12 goals in his first three seasons at the club.

He improved his goal-scoring return over the next two seasons, contributing 10 goals in the 2000–01 season and a further 15 during the 2001–02 campaign. Ferdinand scored the 10,000th goal in Premiership history on 15 December 2001 in a 4–0 win against Fulham. He played in a second League Cup final for the club against Blackburn Rovers in 2002, but was thwarted by three saves by Rovers' goalkeeper Brad Friedel as Spurs lost 2–1.

Later career
After struggling to find a place in Spurs' first team season following Glenn Hoddle's purchase of Robbie Keane from Leeds, he moved to West Ham United on 21 January 2003 for an undisclosed fee. He scored his first goal for the club against former club Tottenham, but was unable to prevent the club's relegation from the Premier League and opted to remain in the top flight by signing for newly promoted Leicester City on a free transfer. While at Leicester Ferdinand scored 14 Premiership goals, despite being 37 years old. After the Foxes were relegated at the end of that season, he rejected a new contract and joined Bolton Wanderers.

Ferdinand memorably scored for Bolton Wanderers against rivals Manchester United in the last minute, despite playing from a centre back position, which looked to have given the Wanderers the win, but a goal from David Bellion even deeper in injury time gave United a point.

He found opportunities from the start limited, but proved useful for all his experience when coming off the substitutes' bench, and scored against former club Tottenham in the League Cup, with what proved to be a mere consolation goal in a 4–3 thriller which Bolton lost. He left them on 2 January 2005. Four days later, he signed with Reading. His contract at the club lasted until the end of the 2004–05 season. He scored one league goal in his time at Reading, in a 2–1 loss to Coventry.

Ferdinand committed to non-contract terms with Watford during the 2005–06, but did not play a competitive game for the club and left after their promotion to the Premier League via the Football League Championship playoffs. He retired from football a few months short of his 40th birthday.

International career
Ferdinand made his England debut in February 1993 against San Marino, scoring the final goal in a 6–0 victory at Wembley. Ferdinand was capped 17 times, scoring five goals. He was part of the Euro 96 and 1998 FIFA World Cup squads.

Coaching career
On 5 November 2008 Ferdinand joined fellow ex-Tottenham player Tim Sherwood on the coaching staff of Tottenham Hotspur, to work with the strikers. Ferdinand left the club on 19 June 2014. On 4 February 2015, Ferdinand became the director of football at Queens Park Rangers.

Career statistics

Honours
Beşiktaş
Turkish Cup: 1988–89

Tottenham Hotspur
Football League Cup: 1998–99

Individual
PFA Players' Player of the Year: 1995–96
Premier League PFA Team of the Year: 1995–96
North-East FWA Player of the Year: 1996
Scorer of the 10,000th Premier League goal – Premier League 10 Seasons Awards (1992–93 – 2001–02)
Leicester City Player of the Year: 2003–04
Newcastle United Hall of Fame Inductee

References

External links

Les Ferdinand info

1966 births
Living people
Footballers from Acton, London
English footballers
England B international footballers
England international footballers
Association football forwards
Southall F.C. players
Hayes F.C. players
Queens Park Rangers F.C. players
Brentford F.C. players
Beşiktaş J.K. footballers
Newcastle United F.C. players
Tottenham Hotspur F.C. players
West Ham United F.C. players
Leicester City F.C. players
Bolton Wanderers F.C. players
Reading F.C. players
Watford F.C. players
English Football League players
Premier League players
Süper Lig players
UEFA Euro 1996 players
1998 FIFA World Cup players
English expatriate footballers
English expatriate sportspeople in Turkey
Expatriate footballers in Turkey
Queens Park Rangers F.C. directors and chairmen
English football managers
Queens Park Rangers F.C. managers
Tottenham Hotspur F.C. non-playing staff
People educated at Phoenix High School, London
English autobiographers
Members of the Order of the British Empire
English people of Saint Lucian descent
Black British sportsmen
Association football coaches